Thomas Gunston Calhoun (1795 – 6 September 1861) was an English clergyman who played a single first-class cricket match for a Kent XI in 1827.

Calhoun was at Chichester in Sussex in 1795, the son of Thomas and Elizabeth Calhoun. His father was a "substantial" landowner from the Southampton area of Hampshire and Calhoun was educated at the University of Oxford. He matriculated at Exeter College, Oxford in 1813 and graduated from Magdalen College in 1817. Aftr graduating, he entered the Church of England, serving as curate at Ferring near Brighton in 1827 and was later vicar of Goring-by-Sea and Upper Beeding. He was elected as a Fellow of Magdalen.

Calhoun made a single first-class appearance for a Kent side in 1827, playing against a Sussex XI at the Royal New Ground at Brighton. This is the only cricket match he is known to have played in and he was probably a late replacement for a missing player in the match. He scored a single run in the two innings in which he batted.

Calhoun died at Goring-by-Sea in 1861.

References

External links

1795 births
1861 deaths
English cricketers
Kent cricketers
Sportspeople from Chichester
People from Goring-by-Sea